Taxpayer groups, taxpayers associations, or taxpayers unions, are formal nonprofit or informal advocacy groups that promote lower taxation, reductions in government spending, and limits to government debt.

Many American cities and counties have taxpayer groups. Members of these groups try to make their presence felt by attending government budget hearings, working with elected officials, and distributing information with their views on taxing and spending. They can even initiate legislation at the state level to keep taxes and spending in check.

List of taxpayers unions
 - Australian Taxpayers' Alliance
 - Canadian Taxpayers' Alliance
 - Canadian Taxpayers Federation
 - German Taxpayers Federation
 - Swedish Taxpayers' Association
 - Swiss Taxpayers Federation
 - New Zealand Taxpayers' Union
 - The TaxPayers' Alliance
 - Americans For Fair Taxation
 - Americans for Tax Reform
 - National Taxpayers Union
 - Taxpayers Association Vijayawada
 - Taxpayers Association of Bharat TAXAB www.taxab.org
 - Nepalese Taxpayers Welfare Society www.ntws.org.np
 - National Taxpayers Association

External links
World Taxpayers Associations